Phillip Dudley Waller (28 January 1889 – 14 December 1917) was an English-born international rugby union forward who played club rugby for Newport and Johannesburg. He won six caps for Wales and also played for the British Isles in their 1910 tour of South Africa.

Rugby career
Waller joined Newport in 1906 and represented the club on 79 appearances. While playing in Britain he represented two county teams, Somerset and Monmouthshire. In 1908 Waller turned out for Newport against the touring Australian team. He debuted for Wales against the same touring Australian team he faced with Newport. The next year he was selected to play in all three matches of the 1909 Home Nations Championship. In his first Home Nations match against England he was joined by fellow Newport player Jack Jones and Swansea's Jack Bancroft. Wales won all their matches and won the Triple Crown. Wales and Waller also faced France during 1909, and after beating them Wales won the unofficial Grand Slam. Waller is therefore one of the very few Welsh internationals to have defeated a Southern Hemisphere team and won a Grand Slam in the same season. Waller played once more for Wales, again against France in a record breaking game in 1910.

Waller was chosen in 1910 to represent the British Isles team in their tour of South Africa. Waller was chosen to play in all three tests, and after the tournament was over, elected to stay in South Africa and played for Johannesburg's Golden Lions. After the outbreak of World War I, he enlisted in the South Africa Artillery Regiment. He was killed by shellfire at Arras in northern France in 1917.

International matches played
Wales
  1905
  1903
  1909, 1911
  1909
  1909

British Isles
  1910, 1910, 1910

References

Bibliography
 

1889 births
1917 deaths
Rugby union players from Bath, Somerset
South African military personnel killed in World War I
Rugby union forwards
English rugby union players
Wales international rugby union players
British & Irish Lions rugby union players from Wales
Newport RFC players
Golden Lions players